Johnston County Courthouse is a historic courthouse building located at Smithfield, Johnston County, North Carolina.  It was designed by architect Harry Barton and built in 1920–1921. It is a three-story, rectangular steel frame building with a cut stone veneer in the Classical Revival style.  It features a four-column portico in antis, a tetrastyle pedimented portico, and a stone balustrade at the roofline.

It was listed on the National Register of Historic Places in 1979.

References

Buildings and structures in Smithfield, North Carolina
County courthouses in North Carolina
Courthouses on the National Register of Historic Places in North Carolina
Government buildings completed in 1921
National Register of Historic Places in Johnston County, North Carolina
Neoclassical architecture in North Carolina